Grevillea incurva is a species of flowering plant in the family Proteaceae and is endemic to inland south-western Western Australia. It is an erect shrub with linear adult leaves and clusters of creamy-yellow flowers.

Description

Taxonomy
This grevillea was first formally described in 1904 by Ludwig Diels who gave it the name Grevillea integrifolia var. incurva in Ernst Georg Pritzel's Botanische Jahrbücher für Systematik, Pflanzengeschichte und Pflanzengeographie. In 1994 Peter M. Olde and Neil R. Marriott raised the variety to species status as Grevillea incurva in The Grevillea Book.
The specific epithet (incurva) means "curved upwards", referring to the leaves.

Distribution and habitat
Grevillea incurva grows on sandy soil in heath between Meckering, Kellerberrin and Harrismith in the Avon Wheatbelt bioregion of inland south-western Western Australia.

Conservation status
Grevillea incurva is listed as "not threatened" by the Government of Western Australia Department of Biodiversity, Conservation and Attractions.

See also
 List of Grevillea species

References

incurva
Proteales of Australia
Eudicots of Western Australia
Taxa named by Ludwig Diels
Plants described in 1904